
Year 13 BC was either a common year starting on Friday, Saturday or Sunday or a leap year starting on Friday or Saturday (link will display the full calendar) of the Julian calendar (the sources differ, see leap year error for further information) and a leap year starting on Wednesday of the Proleptic Julian calendar. At the time, it was known as the Year of the Consulship of Nero and Varus (or, less frequently, year 741 Ab urbe condita). The denomination 13 BC for this year has been used since the early medieval period, when the Anno Domini calendar era became the prevalent method in Europe for naming years.

Events

By place

Roman Empire 
 Tiberius Claudius Nero and Publius Quinctilius Varus are Roman Consuls.
 The Roman general Nero Claudius Drusus builds the stronghold of castrum Moguntiacum in the location of the modern-day city of Mainz, Germany.
 Drusus is granted governor of Gaul and mobilises a Roman army to beat the Germans back across the Rhine. He travels to the North Sea and pays tribute to the Frisii.
 The Ara Pacis Augustae ("Altar of Augustan Peace") is commissioned by the Roman Senate to honor the triumphal return of Emperor Augustus from Hispania and Gaul.
 Revolt in Thrace against Roman rule led by Vologases.

Births 
 Artaxias III, Roman client king of Armenia (d. AD 34)
 Livilla, daughter of Nero Claudius Drusus and Antonia Minor (d. AD 31)

Deaths 
 Marcus Aemilius Lepidus, Roman consul (b. c. 90 BC)
 Paullus Aemilius Lepidus, Roman consul (b. c. 77 BC)
 Rhescuporis II, king of the Odrysian Kingdom

References